Oliverfried is an unincorporated community in Quitman County, Mississippi. Oliverfried is located on Mississippi Highway 3, south of Lambert.

References

Unincorporated communities in Quitman County, Mississippi
Unincorporated communities in Mississippi